Belinda Lima Francis, on album cover simply Belinda, is a Cape Verdean-American singer based in Mindelo.

Belinda Lima Spencer was born in the United States of parents from São Vicente, and grew up in America, including winning Miss Black Rhode Island, then returned to Cabo Verde. In 2007 Belinda Lima was invited by the Cape Verde Embassy in Angola to perform in Luanda, as part of Cape Verde-Angola cultural celebrations. In 2010 she started a musical apprenticeship program in Mindelo which has been featured several times on Radiotelevisão Caboverdiana.

Discography
In 1998 she released an album of Cape Verdean Creole language songs Realidade D'Amor - Music of Cabo Verde. The track list includes: Realidade D’amor – Promessa E Conversa – Mudjer Na Sala – I Love You Anyway – This Time – Irmãos – Bida Triste – Melodia – Voz Di Coraçao.

In 2000 she released a second album of Cape Verdean Creole language songs Um Momento - Music of Cabo Verde. The track list includes: Nha Vida Sem Bo – Graca Santa Maria – Caminho De Amor – Vozinha – Sai d'Nha Vida – Um Momento – Mal Inganado – Cab-Verd – Sono Divino.

References

Year of birth missing (living people)
Living people
21st-century Cape Verdean women singers
People from Mindelo
Singers from São Vicente, Cape Verde
American emigrants to Cape Verde